The Argentine Baseball League (Spanish: Liga Argentina de Béisbol) is the professional baseball league of Argentina. The league was established in 2017. As of the 2018 season, the LAB consists of six teams, representing five different sports clubs.

History
The league was formed in 2017 by two local associations: Federación Cordobesa de Béisbol representing the Córdoba Province, and Liga Salteña de Béisbol, representing the Salta Province. The league was formed to allow Argentina to be represented on the international baseball stage and following affiliation with the Latin American Professional Baseball Association, the league champion is invited to compete in the Latin American Series.

Current teams

Unlike many other professional baseball leagues, the team nickname does not match the name of the sports club it represents, and on the uniforms themselves, it is the club's name which is written, with the nicknames acting as a way of differentiating between teams from the same sports club.

League Champions

See also
Latin American Series
Argentina national baseball team

References

External links
 Official site

Sports leagues established in 2017
2017 establishments in Argentina
Latin American Series
Professional sports leagues in Argentina
Baseball competitions in Argentina
Baseball leagues in South America